Iota Volantis, Latinized as ι Volantis, is the Bayer designation for a star in the southern constellation of Volans. It has an apparent visual magnitude of 5.39, which indicates it is faintly visible to the naked eye. With a parallax of 0.00579″, it lies at an estimated distance of roughly 560 light years from the Sun.

This star has a stellar classification of B7 III, which means it is a B-type giant star. However, some sources give it a classification of B7 IV, which would indicate it is a subgiant star. It has 3.7 times the mass of the Sun and is spinning rapidly with a projected rotational velocity of 129 km/s. The estimated size of the star is 4.7 times the radius of the Sun, and it shines with around 313 times the Sun's luminosity. The effective temperature of the star's outer atmosphere is 11,803 K, giving it the blue-white hue of a B-type star.

References

B-type giants
Volans (constellation)
Volantis, Iota
Durchmusterung objects
051557
032912
2602